Bradfield is a village and former civil parish, now in the parish of Swafield, in the North Norfolk district, in the county of Norfolk, England. In 1931 the parish had a population of 136.

History
Bradfield's name derives from the Anglo-Saxons and refers to a broad area of open country.

Bradfield is not mentioned in the Domesday Book.

On 1 April 1935 the parish was abolished and merged with Swafield.

Transport
The nearest railway station is at Gunton for the Bittern Line which runs between Sheringham, Cromer and Norwich. The nearest airport is Norwich International Airport.

Sport
Bradfield Cricket Club has roots dating back to the late 1800s when a group of farm workers were allowed to play cricket on one of Bradfield Hall Farm fields. Over the years the ground has developed and now boasts one of the best playing surfaces and outfields in the whole of the Norfolk Cricket Alliance.

Saint Giles' Church
Bradfield's parish church is dedicated to Saint Giles and is very large church for what is now a small community. The church, however was once bigger still. There is evidence of this both inside and out, because the north and south arcades were filled in when the aisles were demolished. The pillars and arches can still be seen, set in the walls, the early 14th century capitals revealing the age of the church. 

The porch is dated 1786, along with the churchwardens' names, which is probably shortly after the aisles were demolished. At the east end of the church there is a decorated window and pentagonal buttresses with stone pinnacles added in 1864 when some restoration work was carried out on the church. Above the chancel arch there is a wall painting of Christ in Judgment. He sits on a rainbow showing his wounds. The wall painting dates from the 15th century.

Church gallery

War Memorial
Bradfield's War Memorial takes the form of a brass plaque located inside St. Giles' Church. It holds the following names for the First World War:
 Lance-Corporal John S. Futter (d.1917), 8th Battalion, Rifle Brigade (The Prince Consort's Own)
 Private Robert F. S. Futter (1894-1915), 10th Battalion, Essex Regiment
 Private Herbert J. Hewitt (d.1915), 1st Battalion, Royal Norfolk Regiment
 Private Percy Hammond (1891-1916), 2nd Battalion, Royal Norfolk Regiment
 Private Ernest Towler (d.1915), 2nd Battalion, Northumberland Fusiliers

References

External links

Villages in Norfolk
Former civil parishes in Norfolk
North Norfolk